The 2016–17 Irish Cup (known as the Tennent's Irish Cup for sponsorship purposes) was the 137th edition of the premier knock-out cup competition in Northern Irish football since its introduction in 1881. The competition began on 19 August 2016 and concluded with the final at Windsor Park on 6 May 2017.

Glenavon were the defending champions, after they lifted the cup for the seventh time by defeating Linfield 2–0 in the 2016 final. They were eliminated at the semi-final stage. The competition was won by Linfield, who defeated Coleraine 3-0 in the final.

Format and Schedule
126 clubs entered this season's competition, a decrease of three clubs compared with the 2015–16 total of 129 clubs. 12 members of the NIFL Premier Intermediate League and 90 regional league clubs from tiers 4–7 in the Northern Ireland football league system entered the competition in the first round, 26 of whom received a bye to proceed directly into the second round as necessitated by the number of participants. These clubs contested the first four rounds, with the eight surviving clubs joining the 24 senior NIFL Premiership and NIFL Championship clubs in the fifth round. All ties level after 90 minutes used extra time to determine the winner, with a penalty shoot-out to follow if necessary.

Results

First round
Ties to be play on 20 August 2016. Twenty-six clubs received byes into the second round: Ardglass, Ards Rangers, Ballymoney United, Ballynahinch United, Barn United, Camlough Rovers, Crumlin Star, Donard Hospital, Dromara Village, Drumaness Mills, Dundela, Killyleagh Youth, Larne Tech. Old Boys, Lisburn Rangers, Maiden City, Mossley, Nortel, Portstewart, Richhill A.F.C., St Luke's, St Mary's Youth, Seagoe, Short Brothers, Strabane Athletic, Tobermore United and Wakehurst. Maiden City later withdrew.

|-
|colspan="3" style="background:#E8FFD8;"|19 August 2016

|-
|colspan="3" style="background:#E8FFD8;"|20 August 2016

|-
|colspan="3" style="background:#E8FFD8;"|21 August 2016

|}

Second round
Due to there being an uneven number of clubs left on account of Maiden City's withdrawal, in the draw Dollingstown received a bye to the third round.

|}

Third round
Ties played on 5 November 2016.

|}

Fourth round
Ties played on 3 December 2016.

|}

Fifth round
Ties played on 7 January 2017. The draw resulted in a clash between Belfast's Big Two.

|}

Sixth Round
Ties to be played on 4 February 2017.

|}

Quarter-finals
The 8 winners of the sixth round matches entered the quarter-finals. The draw took place on 5 February 2017, with the matches to be played on 4 March 2017. As the only representative from the NIFL Championship, Warrenpoint Town was the lowest-ranked club to reach the quarter-finals.

|}

Semi-finals
The 4 winners of the quarter finals entered the semi finals with the ties played on 1 April 2017 with Linfield and Coleraine advancing to contest the 2017 final.

|}

Final
Linfield and Coleraine contested the final with Linfield winning 3–0 to secure the Cup for a record 43rd time, and claim their first league and cup double since 2012. Andrew Waterworth became the first player in 48 years to score a hat trick in an Irish Cup final. Billy McAvoy had been the last player to achieve the feat, having done so for Ards in their 4–2 win over Distillery in the 1969 final replay.

References

External links
 Official site
 nifootball.co.uk

2016-17
Cup
2016–17 European domestic association football cups